William Everett Strange (September 29, 1930 – February 22, 2012) was an American singer, songwriter, guitarist, and an actor. He was a session musician with the famed Wrecking Crew, and was inducted into the Musicians Hall of Fame and Museum as a member of The Wrecking Crew in 2007.

Biography

Early life
Billy Strange was born in Long Beach, California on September 29, 1930.

Recordings and songwriting
Strange teamed up with Mac Davis to write several hit songs for Elvis Presley, including "A Little Less Conversation", the theme from Charro!, and "Memories". Strange also composed the musical soundtrack for two of Presley's films Live a Little, Love a Little and The Trouble with Girls. He also wrote "Limbo Rock" which was recorded by The Champs and Chubby Checker.

Strange recorded arrangements of James Bond movie themes for GNP Crescendo Records and provided the instrumental backing and arrangement for Nancy Sinatra's non-soundtrack version of "You Only Live Twice", as well as Nancy and Frank Sinatra's "Somethin' Stupid". He was recognized by the Rockabilly Hall of Fame for his pioneering contribution to the genre.

Strange played guitar on numerous Beach Boys hits, including "Sloop John B" and the Pet Sounds album. He also played guitar for Nancy Sinatra, Jan & Dean, The Ventures, Willie Nelson, The Everly Brothers, Wanda Jackson, Randy Newman, and Nat King Cole, among others. One of his most famous performances is on Nancy Sinatra's version of "Bang Bang (My Baby Shot Me Down)".

Strange arranged and conducted all of Nancy Sinatra's Reprise albums as well as Nancy Sinatra's and Lee Hazlewood's 1972 RCA Records release, Nancy & Lee Again and their 2003 album, Nancy & Lee 3.  He also arranged the 1981 Sinatra and Mel Tillis album, Mel & Nancy.  He arranged and conducted for Frank Sinatra, Dean Martin, Sammy Davis, Jr., Duane Eddy, and Elvis Presley.  One of his most famous arrangements was "These Boots Are Made for Walkin'" for Nancy Sinatra.  Strange also performed the vocals for Steve McQueen in Baby the Rain Must Fall.

Heard on the soundtracks of many Disney features, Strange played themes for such TV shows as "The Munsters" (1964), "Batman" (1966), and "Have Gun – Will Travel" (1957).  He is the guitarist heard on the theme to "The Munsters".

"A Little Less Conversation", which he wrote with Mac Davis, was on the soundtracks of the DreamWorks animated feature films Shark Tale (2004) and Megamind (2010).

He sang his own composition, "The Ballad of Bunny and Claude", in the Merrie Melodies Bunny And Claude (We Rob Carrot Patches) (1968) and The Great Carrot-Train Robbery (1969).

Personal life
Strange was son of George Strange, a radio entertainer, and Vella Evans Strange.

Strange was married to singer and actress Joan O'Brien from 1954 to 1955. They had a son, Russell Glen Strange, born on October 4, 1955.
 
He was also married to Betty Jo Conrad (son: Jerry Strange) from 1960 to 1978. They had a daughter together, Kelly Kimberly Strange, born on November 11, 1964.

While separated from Betty Jo, Strange moved from California to Tennessee to open and run a publishing firm for the Sinatras and lived with/dated Tricia "LeAnn" King. They had a daughter, Mary "Micah" King (Strange), who was born on December 23, 1976 in Lawrenceburg, Tennessee.

Strange was married to singer Jeanne Black in his final years.  He died on February 22, 2012, aged 81.

Selected filmography

As actor
Coal Miner's Daughter – Speedy West (1980)

Film & TV scores

Movin' with Nancy (1967)
Live a Little, Love a Little (1968)
Elvis (1968)
The Trouble with Girls (1969)
De Sade (1969)
Bunny O'Hare (1971)
The Simpsons (1995, 1 episode)
Ocean's Eleven (2001)
Smallville (2002, 1 episode)
Everybody Loves Raymond (2003, 1 episode)
Bruce Almighty (2003)
Shark Tale (2004)
Megamind (2010)

Selected discography

 Billy Strange Plays Roger Miller
 Mr. Guitar
 The James Bond Theme / Walk Don't Run '64
 English Hits of '65
 Goldfinger
 Secret Agent File (later rereleased as a compilation)
 James Bond Double Feature
 In the Mexican Bag
 Great Western Themes
 Billy Strange and The Challengers
 Strange Country
 12 String Guitar
 Railroad Man
 Super Scary Monster Party (compilation)
 De Sade (film soundtrack)

References

External links

1930 births
2012 deaths
American male composers
20th-century American composers
American session musicians
American male singers
Songwriters from California
Male actors from Long Beach, California
The Wrecking Crew (music) members
Era Records artists
Liberty Records artists
Writers from Long Beach, California
Musicians from Long Beach, California
Guitarists from California
American male guitarists
20th-century American guitarists
20th-century American male musicians
American male songwriters